Geeta Khanna ( Gītā Khannā, born on 20 December 1951) is an Indian voice actress. She specializes in dubbing foreign media into the Hindi language, which is her native mother-tongue language that she majorly speaks. In credit, she is also known as Gita Khanna or Geetha Khanna, via some translations. She has also acted in Hindi movies like; Zila Ghaziabad, Kis Kis Ki Kismat, Chandradas, Haveli, Chase, Bachke Rehna Re Baba etc. which can be found on IMDB.

She currently lives in Bandra West, as her residence located in West Mumbai of India..She lived in Bandra west but shifted to MIRA Road.

Dubbing career
She is well known for dubbing over Mother and Grandmother roles in Hindi, from foreign media. She is also well known for voicing Queen and Witch characters in Hindi. She has contributed to cartoons, and participated in the Hindi dubs of some of the computer-generated animated Barbie films franchise.

Dubbing roles

Animated series

Live action films

Animated films

See also
Dubbing (filmmaking)
List of Indian Dubbing Artists

References

1951 births
Actresses from Mumbai
Indian voice actresses
Living people